The United States federal budget consists of mandatory expenditures (which includes Medicare and Social Security), discretionary spending for defense, Cabinet departments (e.g., Justice Department) and agencies (e.g., Securities & Exchange Commission), and interest payments on debt. This is currently over half of U.S. government spending, the remainder coming from state and local governments.

During FY2018, the federal government spent $4.11 trillion, up $127 billion or 3.2% vs. FY2017 spending of $3.99 trillion. Spending increased for all major categories and was mainly driven by higher spending for Social Security, net interest on the debt, and defense. Spending as % GDP fell from 20.7% GDP to 20.3% GDP, equal to the 50-year average. During FY2017, the federal government spent $3.98 trillion, up $128 billion or 3.3% vs. FY2016 spending of $3.85 trillion. Major categories of FY 2017 spending included: Healthcare such as Medicare and Medicaid ($1,077B or 27% of spending), Social Security ($939B or 24%), non-defense discretionary spending used to run federal Departments and Agencies ($610B or 15%), Defense Department ($590B or 15%), and interest ($263B or 7%).

Expenditures are classified as "mandatory", with payments required by specific laws to those meeting eligibility criteria (e.g., Social Security and Medicare), or "discretionary", with payment amounts renewed annually as part of the budget process, such as defense. Around two thirds of federal spending is for "mandatory" programs. CBO projects that mandatory program spending and interest costs will rise relative to GDP over the 2016–2026 period, while defense and other discretionary spending will decline relative to GDP.

Discretionary vs. mandatory spending 

Discretionary spending requires an annual appropriation bill, which is a piece of legislation.  Discretionary spending is typically set by the House and Senate Appropriations Committees and their various subcommittees.  Since the spending is typically for a fixed period (usually a year), it is said to be under the discretion of the Congress.  Some appropriations last for more than one year (see Appropriation bill for details).  In particular, multi-year appropriations are often used for housing programs and military procurement programs.

Direct spending, also known as mandatory spending, refers to spending enacted by law, but not dependent on an annual or periodic appropriation bill.  Most mandatory spending consists of entitlement programs such as Social Security benefits, Medicare, and Medicaid.    These programs are called "entitlements" because individuals satisfying given eligibility requirements set by past legislation are entitled to Federal government benefits or services.  Many other expenses, such as salaries of Federal judges, are mandatory, but account for a relatively small share of federal spending.

The Congressional Budget Office (CBO) reports the costs of mandatory spending programs in a variety of annual and special topic publications. Congress can affect spending on entitlement programs by changing eligibility requirements or the structure of programs. Certain entitlement programs, because the language authorizing them are included in appropriation bills, are termed "appropriated entitlements." This is a convention rather than a substantive distinction, since the programs, such as Food Stamps, would continue to be funded even if the appropriation bill were to be vetoed or otherwise not enacted.

The share of Federal spending for mandatory programs has been increasing as the U.S. population ages, while the discretionary spending share has fallen.

Growth of mandatory spending

CBO projects that spending for Social Security, healthcare programs and interest costs will rise relative to GDP between 2017 and 2027, while defense and other discretionary spending will decline relative to GDP.

Over the past 40 years, mandatory spending for programs like Medicare and Social Security has grown as a share of the budget and relative to GDP, while other discretionary categories have declined. Medicare, Medicaid, and Social Security grew from 4.3% of GDP in 1971 to 10.7% of GDP in 2016.

In the long-run, expenditures related to Social Security, Medicare, and Medicaid are growing considerably faster than the economy overall as the population matures. The Congressional Budget Office (CBO) estimates that Social Security spending will rise from 4.8% of GDP in 2009 to 6.2% of GDP by 2035, where it will stabilize. However, the CBO expects Medicare and Medicaid to continue growing, rising from 5.3% GDP in 2009 to 10.0% in 2035 and 19.0% by 2082. CBO has indicated healthcare spending per beneficiary is the primary long-term fiscal challenge. Further, multiple government and private sources have indicated the overall expenditure path is unsustainable.

Mandatory spending and entitlements

Social Security and Medicare expenditures are funded by permanent appropriations and so are considered mandatory spending according to the 1997 Budget Enforcement Act (BEA).  Social Security and Medicare are sometimes called "entitlements," because people meeting relevant eligibility requirements are legally entitled to benefits, although most pay taxes into these programs throughout their working lives.

Some programs, such as Food Stamps, are appropriated entitlements. Some mandatory spending, such as Congressional salaries, is not part of any entitlement program. Funds to make federal interest payments have been automatically appropriated since 1847.

Major categories of FY 2014 mandatory spending included: 
 Social Security ($845B or 24% of spending), 
 Healthcare such as Medicare and Medicaid ($831B or 24%), 
 other mandatory programs such as food stamps and unemployment compensation ($420B or 12%) and interest ($229B or 6.5%).

As a share of federal budget, mandatory spending has increased over time. Mandatory spending accounted for 53% of total federal outlays in FY2008, with net interest payments accounting for an additional 8.5%. In 2011, mandatory spending had increased to 56% of federal outlays.

From 1991 to 2011, mandatory spending grew from 10.1 percent to 13.6 percent of GDP, according to figures from the Congressional Budget Office. This spending is expected to continue to increase as a share of GDP. According to the conservative Heritage Foundation, spending on Social Security, Medicare, and Medicaid will rise from 8.7% of GDP in 2010, to 11.0% by 2020 and to 18.1% by 2050.

Since the federal government has historically collected about 18.4% of GDP in tax revenues, this means these three mandatory programs may absorb all federal revenues sometime around 2050. Unless these long-term fiscal imbalances are addressed by reforms to these programs, raising taxes or drastic cuts in discretionary programs, the federal government will at some point be unable to pay its obligations without significant risk to the value of the dollar (inflation).

According to the U.S. Census Bureau, in 2011 49.1% of the U.S. population lived in a household where at least one household member received a government benefit including Social Security and Medicare.
This figure represented an increase from 30% in the early 1980s and 44.4% in 2008. While federal outlay for welfare was reduced by half since 1996, programs such as food stamps have seen increases in spending. In 2012, 35% of the U.S. population lived in a household that received government benefits, counting only means-tested programs such as food stamps, housing assistance and Medicaid.

Mandatory programs are affected by demographic trends. The number of workers continues declining relative to those receiving benefits. For example, the number of workers per retiree was 5.1 in 1960; this declined to 3.3 in 2007 and is projected to decline to 2.1 by 2040. According to census data for 2011, 16% of the population lived in a household where at least one individual received Social Security and 15% lived in a household where at least one individual received Medicare. From 2012 to 2027, approximately 78 million individuals will retire and begin receiving Social Security and Medicare.

These programs are also affected by per-person costs, which are also expected to increase at a rate significantly higher than the economy. The unfavorable combination of demographics and per-capita rate increases is expected to drive both Social Security and Medicare into large deficits during the 21st century. Multiple government sources have argued these programs are fiscally unsustainable as presently structured due to the extent of future borrowing and related interest required to fund them; here is a 2009 summary from the Social Security and Medicare Trustees:

Since the government borrowed and spent the trust funds' assets, there is no "lockbox" or marketable investment portfolio of $2.4 trillion for Social Security or $380 billion for Medicare. The trust funds contain non-marketable treasury securities that the government is legally obligated to pay. In the absence of a balanced budget, the government will be required to convert these non-marketable securities to marketable securities by borrowing in the future, as trust fund claims are redeemed.

Medicare and Medicaid

Medicare was established in 1965 and expanded thereafter. In 2009, the program covered an estimated 45 million persons (38 million aged and 7 million disabled). It consists of four distinct parts which are funded differently:
 Part A (Hospital Insurance, or HI) covers inpatient hospital services, skilled nursing care, and home health and hospice care. The HI trust fund is mainly funded by a dedicated payroll tax of 2.9% of earnings, shared equally between employers and workers.
 Part B (Supplementary Medical Insurance, or SMI) covers physician services, outpatient services, and home health and preventive services. The SMI trust fund is funded through beneficiary premiums (set at 25% of estimated program costs for the aged) and general revenues (the remaining amount, approximately 75%).
 Part C (Medicare Advantage, or MA) is a private plan option for beneficiaries that covers all Part A and B services, except hospice. Individuals choosing to enroll in Part C must also enroll in Part B. Part C is funded through the HI and SMI trust funds.
 Part D covers prescription drug benefits. Funding is included in the SMI trust fund and is financed through beneficiary premiums (about 25%) and general revenues (about 75%).

Various reform strategies were proposed for healthcare, including Medicare and Medicaid. Examples include: comparative effectiveness research; independent review panels; modifying doctor incentives to focus on better care rather than fee for service; addressing a shortage of doctors and nurses; taxing healthcare benefits paid for by employers; addressing tort reform and defensive medicine; preventing obesity and related expensive conditions; addressing fraud; streamlining redundant payment systems; and improved healthcare technology.

Growth in medical spending
Spending on Medicare and Medicaid is projected to grow dramatically in coming decades. The number of persons enrolled in Medicare is expected to increase from 47 million in 2010 to 80 million by 2030. While the same demographic trends that affect Social Security also affect Medicare, rapidly rising medical prices appear to be a more important cause of projected spending increases.

The CBO has indicated that: "Future growth in spending per beneficiary for Medicare and Medicaid—the federal government’s major health care programs—will be the most important determinant of long-term trends in federal spending. Changing those programs in ways that reduce the growth of costs—which will be difficult, in part because of the complexity of health policy choices—is ultimately the nation’s central long-term challenge in setting federal fiscal policy."  Further, the CBO also projects that "total federal Medicare and Medicaid outlays will rise from 4 percent of GDP in 2007 to 12 percent in 2050 and 19 percent in 2082—which, as a share of the economy, is roughly equivalent to the total amount that the federal government spends today. The bulk of that projected increase in health care spending reflects higher costs per beneficiary rather than an increase in the number of beneficiaries associated with an aging population."

President Obama stated in May 2009: "But we know that our families, our economy, and our nation itself will not succeed in the 21st century if we continue to be held down by the weight of rapidly rising health care costs and a broken health care system...Our businesses will not be able to compete; our families will not be able to save or spend; our budgets will remain unsustainable unless we get health care costs under control."

The present value of unfunded obligations under all parts of Medicare during FY 2007 is approximately $34.1 trillion. In other words, this amount would have to be set aside today such that the principal and interest would cover the shortfall over the next 75 years. This is over six times as large as the Social Security unfunded obligation of $5.3 trillion, discussed below.

Social Security

Social Security is a social insurance program officially called "Old-Age, Survivors, and Disability Insurance" (OASDI), in reference to its three components. It is primarily funded through a dedicated payroll tax. During 2009, total benefits of $686 billion were paid out versus income (taxes and interest) of $807 billion, a $121 billion annual surplus. An estimated 156 million people paid into the program and 53 million received benefits, roughly 2.94 workers per beneficiary.  During 2008, total benefits of $625 billion were paid out versus income (taxes and interest) of $805 billion, a $180 billion annual surplus. An estimated 162 million people paid into the program and 51 million received benefits, roughly 3.2 workers per beneficiary.

There is significant confusion about the program, due in part to the accounting for surplus payroll tax receipts and the agendas of various political constituencies. A few key points to understand under current law, if no reforms are implemented:
 Social Security is funded by a dedicated payroll tax of 12.4%. This means that Social Security will be paid at least to the extent of payroll tax collections. Program payroll tax collections were roughly equal to payouts in 2010 and are estimated to fall to about 75% of payouts by the mid-2030s and continue around that level through the early 2080s. Claims that the program is "bankrupt" or "going bankrupt" can be evaluated in this context.
 Since the Greenspan Commission in the early 1980s, Social Security has cumulatively collected far more in payroll taxes dedicated to the program than it has paid out to recipients—nearly $2.4 trillion by 2008. This surplus amount is commonly referred to as the "Social Security Trust Fund." This surplus amount has not added to the public debt; rather it is the spending of surplus funds dedicated to the program for other purposes that has added to the debt.
 The Trust Fund represents a legal claim by Social Security recipients, enabling them to compel the government to borrow or otherwise fund 100% of program obligations as long as Trust Fund amounts remain. As sources of funds (other than the dedicated payroll taxes) are diverted to the program, the Trust Fund balance is reduced. Once the Trust Fund is liquidated in the mid-2030s under various estimates, program payouts will fall to about 75% of currently scheduled benefits. Social Security then becomes a true "pay as you go" program, without Trust Fund amounts to cover shortfalls.
 Redemption of Trust Fund claims means that the government will have to borrow an additional $2.4 trillion in total (based on the 2008 Trust Fund balance) over approximately 20 years, from the time the program payouts begin to exceed tax collections around 2015 to the time the Trust Fund is exhausted in the mid-2030s. This is a funding challenge for the government overall, not just Social Security.

Social Security spending will increase sharply over the next decades, largely due to the retirement of the baby boom generation. The number of program recipients is expected to increase from 44 million in 2010 to 73 million in 2030. Program spending is projected to rise from 4.8% of GDP in 2010 to 5.9% of GDP by 2030, where it will stabilize.

The CBO projected in 2010 that an increase in payroll taxes ranging from 1.6–2.1% of the payroll tax base, equivalent to 0.6%-0.8% of GDP, would be necessary to put the Social Security program in fiscal balance for the next 75 years. In other words, raising the payroll tax rate to about 14.4% during 2009 (from the current 12.4%) or cutting benefits by 13.3% would address the program's budgetary concerns indefinitely; these amounts increase to around 16% and 24% if no changes are made until 2037. Projections of Social Security's solvency are sensitive to assumptions about rates of economic growth and demographic changes.

Since recommendations of the Greenspan Commission were adopted in the early 1980s, Social Security payroll taxes have exceeded benefit payments.  In FY2008, Social Security received $180 billion more in payroll taxes and accrued interest than it paid out in benefits.  This annual surplus is credited to Social Security trust funds that hold special non-marketable Treasury securities. The Social Security surplus reduces the amount of U.S. Treasury borrowing from the public, as the surplus funds may be used for other government purposes. The total balance of the trust funds was $2.4 trillion in 2008 and is estimated to reach $3.7 trillion by 2016. At that point, payments will exceed payroll tax revenues, resulting in the gradual reduction of the trust funds balance as the securities are redeemed against other types of government revenues.  By 2037, according to some estimates, the trust funds will be exhausted. Under current law, Social Security payouts would be reduced by 24% at that time, as only payroll taxes are authorized to cover benefits.

The present value of unfunded obligations under Social Security as of January 1, 2009 has been estimated at approximately $5.3 trillion over a 75-year horizon. In other words, this amount would have to be set aside today such that the principal and interest would cover the shortfall over the next 75 years. The estimated annual shortfall averages 1.9% of the payroll tax base or 0.7% of gross domestic product. For a GDP of approximately $14 trillion in 2009, this 0.7% gap is roughly $100 billion per year or 5% of tax revenue. Over an infinite time horizon, these shortfalls average 3.4% of the payroll tax base and 1.2% of GDP.

Various reforms have been debated for Social Security. Examples include reducing future annual cost of living adjustments (COLA) provided to recipients, raising the retirement age, and raising the income limit subject to the payroll tax ($106,800 in 2009). The Urban Institute estimated the effects of solution alternatives during May 2010, including an estimated program deficit reduction for each:
 Reducing the COLA by one percentage point: 75%
 Indexing the COLA to prices rather than wages, except for bottom one-third of income earners: 65%
 Raising the payroll tax rate by one percentage point: 50%.
 Raising the payroll tax cap (currently at $106,800) to cover 90% instead of 84% of earnings: 35%
 Increasing the full retirement age to 68: 30%

The CBO reported in July 2010 the effects of a series of policy options on the "actuarial balance" shortfall, which over the 75 year horizon is approximately 0.6% of GDP. This is slightly different from the 0.7% estimated by the Social Security Trustees, as indicated above. For example, CBO estimates that raising the payroll tax by two percentage points (from 12.4% to 14.4%) over 20 years would increase annual program revenues by 0.6% of GDP, solving the 75-year shortfall. The various impacts are summarized in the CBO chart at right.

CBO estimated in January 2012 that raising the full retirement age for Social Security from 67 to 70 would reduce outlays by about 13%. Raising the early retirement age from 62 to 64 has little impact, as those who wait longer to begin receiving benefits get a higher amount. Raising the retirement age increases the size of the workforce and the size of the economy by about 1%.

Military spending

During FY 2009, the GAO reported that the U.S. government incurred approximately $683 billion in expenses for the Department of Defense (DoD) and $54 billion for Homeland Security, a total of $737 billion. The GAO financial statements present data on an accrual basis, meaning as expenses are incurred rather than actual cash payments.

President Obama's 2010 budget proposal includes a total of $663.8 billion, including $533.8 billion for the DOD and $130 billion for overseas contingencies, primarily the wars in Iraq and Afghanistan. The proposed DoD base budget represents an increase of $20.5 billion over the $513.3 billion enacted for fiscal 2009. This is an increase of 4%, or 2.1% percent real growth after adjusting for inflation. The fiscal 2010 budget proposal brought the overseas contingency supplemental requests into the budget process, adding the $130 billion amount to the deficit.

The U.S. defense budget (excluding spending for the wars in Iraq and Afghanistan, Homeland Security, and Veteran's Affairs) is around 4% of GDP. Adding these other costs places defense and homeland security spending between 5% and 6% of GDP.

The DoD baseline budget, excluding supplemental funding for the wars, has grown from $297 billion in FY2001 to a budgeted $534 billion for FY2010, an 81% increase. According to the CBO, defense spending grew 9% annually on average from fiscal year 2000–2009.

Debate about military spending
Democratic Congressman Barney Frank called for a significant reduction in the defense budget during February 2009: "The math is compelling: if we do not make reductions approximating 25 percent of the military budget starting fairly soon, it will be impossible to continue to fund an adequate level of domestic activity even with a repeal of Bush's tax cuts for the very wealthy. I am working with a variety of thoughtful analysts to show how we can make very substantial cuts in the military budget without in any way diminishing the security we need...[American] well-being is far more endangered by a proposal for substantial reductions in Medicare, Social Security or other important domestic areas than it would be by canceling weapons systems that have no justification from any threat we are likely to face."

U.S. Secretary of Defense Robert Gates wrote in January 2009 that the U.S. should adjust its priorities and spending to address the changing nature of threats in the world: "What all these potential adversaries—from terrorist cells to rogue nations to rising powers—have in common is that they have learned that it is unwise to confront the United States directly on conventional military terms. The United States cannot take its current dominance for granted and needs to invest in the programs, platforms, and personnel that will ensure that dominance's persistence. But it is also important to keep some perspective. As much as the U.S. Navy has shrunk since the end of the Cold War, for example, in terms of tonnage, its battle fleet is still larger than the next 13 navies combined—and 11 of those 13 navies are U.S. allies or partners."

In 2009, the US Department of Defense's annual report to Congress on China's military strength offered several estimates of actual 2008 Chinese military spending.  In terms of the prevailing exchange rate, Pentagon estimates range between US$105 and US$150 billion, the second highest in the world after the US.

Budgetary treatment of Iraq & Afghanistan war expenses
CBO estimated in January 2010 that approximately $1.1 trillion was authorized for spending on the Iraq and Afghanistan Wars between 2001 and 2010. Spending peaked in 2008 at $187 billion and declined to $130 billion by 2010.

Much of the costs for the wars in Iraq and Afghanistan have not been funded through regular appropriations bills, but through emergency supplemental appropriations bills. As such, most of these expenses were not included in the budget deficit calculation prior to FY2010. Some budget experts argue that emergency supplemental appropriations bills do not receive the same level of legislative care as regular appropriations bills. In addition, emergency supplemental appropriations are not subject to the same budget enforcement mechanisms imposed on regular appropriations.  Funding for the first stages of the Vietnam War was provided by supplemental appropriations, although President Johnson eventually acceded to Congressional demands to fund that war through the regular appropriations process.

Budget authority is legal authority to obligate the federal government.  For many war-related activities there may be a long lag between the time when budget authority is granted and when payments (outlays) are made by the U.S. Treasury.  In particular, spending on reconstruction activities in Iraq and Afghanistan has lagged behind available budget authority.  In other cases, the military uses contracts that are payable upon completion, which can create long lags between appropriations and outlays.

In principle, the Department of Defense (DoD) separates war funding from base funding. In most cases, however, funds for operations in Iraq and Afghanistan use the same accounts as other DoD accounts.  This raises challenges to attempts to achieve a precise separation of expenditures on operations in Iraq and Afghanistan from the base defense operations.

Discretionary spending

Discretionary spending is spending that is not mandated on a multi-year basis by existing legislation, and thus must be determined anew in each year's budget.  Discretionary spending is used to fund the Cabinet Departments (e.g., the Department of Education) and Agencies (e.g., the Environmental Protection Agency), although these are often the recipients of some mandatory funding as well. Discretionary budget authority is established annually by Congress, as opposed to mandatory spending that is required by laws that span multiple years, such as Social Security or Medicare.

The Federal government spent approximately $600 billion during 2016 on the Cabinet departments and Agencies, excluding the Department of Defense, representing 16% of budgeted expenditures or about 3.3% of GDP. The 2011 budget included estimated spending for 2010, shown in the graph at right for selected departments and agencies with over $10 billion in budget authority.

Funding for the Department of Defense is mostly discretionary, but is excluded from this total and analyzed separately in this article. However, certain defense-related spending is included in other departments, such as Homeland Security and Veteran's Affairs. The U.S. Constitution (Article I, Section 8) grants the Congress the authority to "To raise and support armies, but no appropriation of money to that use shall be for a longer term than two years."

Funding for science research and development is mainly funded through discretionary funding through agencies such as the National Institutes of Health, Department of Energy Office of Science, National Aeronautics and Space Administration, and National Science Foundation.  Slightly more than half of federal research and development funds go to the Department of Defense and thus overlaps with military spending.

Several politicians and think tanks have proposed freezing non-defense discretionary spending at particular levels and holding this spending constant for various periods of time. President Obama proposed freezing discretionary spending representing approximately 12% of the budget in his 2011 State of the Union address.

Interest expense

Budgeted net interest on the public debt was approximately $245 billion in FY2012 (7% of spending). During FY2012, the government also accrued a non-cash interest expense of $187 billion for intra-governmental debt, primarily the Social Security Trust Fund, for a total interest expense of $432 billion. This accrued interest is added to the Social Security Trust Fund and therefore the national debt each year and will be paid to Social Security recipients in the future. However, since it is a non-cash expense it is excluded from the budget deficit calculation.

Net interest costs paid on the public debt declined from $203 billion in 2011 to $187 billion in 2012 because of lower interest rates. Should these rates return to historical averages, the interest cost would increase dramatically.

During 2013, the U.S. Federal Reserve is expected to purchase about $45 billion of U.S. treasury securities per month in addition to the $40 billion in mortgage debt it’s purchasing, effectively absorbing about 90 percent of  This reduces the supply of bonds available for sale to investors, raising bond prices and lowering interest rates, which helps boost the U.S. economy.  During 2012, global demand for U.S. debt was strong and interest rates were near record lows.

Analytical perspectives

Federal spending per capita

Federal spending per capita (that is, per person in the U.S.) was approximately $11,551 during 2011, versus $6,338 in 2000. Adjusted for inflation, these amounts were $5,133 in 2011 and $3,496 in 2000. Adjusted for inflation, federal spending per person remained around $3,500 throughout the 1990s. It then began to rise steadily after 2000, then jumped in 2008 and 2009 due to the federal response to the subprime mortgage crisis.

References

External links
  
  
 The New York Times: Obama’s 2012 Budget Proposal—A visualization of the Obama administration's FY2012 budget proposal.
 CBPP-Policy Basics-Where Do Our Federal Tax Dollars Go? April 2013

United States federal budgets
Expenditure